Ivan Maksymovych Soshenko (2 June 1807 Bohuslav, in the Kiev Governorate of the Russian Empire — 18 July 1876 Korsun) was a Ukrainian painter.

Soshenko studied at the Saint Petersburg Academy of Arts from 1834 to 1838, then taught painting in gymnasiums in Nizhyn from 1839 to 1846, Nemyriv from 1846 to 1856, and Kyiv.  His work included portraits, genre scenes, landscapes, and religious icons.

In 1835 he met and befriended Taras Shevchenko.  Along with teaching him the use of watercolors, Soshenko also introduced him to authors and painters Yevhen Hrebinka, Vasily Zhukovsky, Karl Briullov, and Alexey Venetsianov, and helped in the purchase Shevchenko's freedom from serfdom. Later, he helped Shevchenko to be admitted to the St Petersburg Academy of Arts.

Mykhailo Chaly published a biography of Soshenko in Kyiv in 1876.

Gallery

References

External links
 Marble bust of Soshenko I.M. 1807-1876

1807 births
1876 deaths
People from Bohuslav
People from Kiev Governorate
Ukrainian people in the Russian Empire
19th-century Ukrainian painters
19th-century Ukrainian male artists
Ukrainian male painters